Solute carrier family 17 member 9 is a protein that in humans is encoded by the SLC17A9 gene.

Function

This gene encodes a member of a family of transmembrane proteins that are involved in the transport of small molecules. The encoded protein participates in the vesicular uptake, storage, and secretion of adenoside triphosphate (ATP) and other nucleotides. A mutation in this gene was found in individuals with autosomal dominant disseminated superficial actinic porokeratosis-8. Alternative splicing results in multiple transcript variants.

References

Further reading